This is a list of rivers of the Czech Republic.

Naming conventions
Czech language distinguishes between larger (river) and smaller (stream, creek, brook etc.) watercourses; the respective nouns being řeka (feminine, "river") and potok (masculine, "stream"). River names are mostly self-standing nouns and not accompanied with the generic word for river (except when confusion might arose because name is shared with some towns, e.g. Jihlava; in such cases one sometimes says řeka Jihlava).

In contrast, stream names mostly consist of two words because they contain an adjective (usually stemming from physical properties (e.g. Černý potok-"Black Stream"), usage (e.g. Mlýnský potok – "Mill Stream") or derived from location through which it flows (e.g. Rakovnický potok-"Rakovník Stream")). These two-word names are used as a whole, the word potok making an inseparable part of the name (i.e. Mlýnský potok, not just Mlýnský). There are also streams with one-word names (either masculine or feminine) akin to rivers (e.g. Botič or Modla) but they are simply considered streams due to their small size. In such cases the word potok is optional and precedes the name (potok Modla).

Drainage basins

As the Main European Watershed passes through the Czech Republic, there are three directions and principal areas of drainage (very roughly overlapping with historical territories of Bohemia, Moravia and Silesia): 
Almost 2/3 of the country is drained in NW direction through the Elbe into the North Sea. 
The Morava flowing towards SE collects water from eastern regions of the Czech Republic and discharges into Danube which flows to the Black Sea. 
The northeast and some northern portions of the territory is drained by the Oder and its tributaries like Lausitzer Neisse into the Baltic Sea. The corresponding watershed tripoint with a marker for symbolic "roof of Europe" (50°9'27"N 16°47'27"E) is located at Czech-Polish border on Mt. Klepý near Dolní Morava in Králický Sněžník Mountains.

This figure includes upper courses of some tributaries starting in neighbouring countries. The area solely within Czech borders is slightly smaller and this is the figure given in the following table, which shows Czech territory divided after drainage basins.

Table of rivers
While the Elbe is the longest Czech-related river when measured through its overall length (i.e. including its lower course in Germany), its tributary the Vltava surpasses it as the longest river within the territory of the Czech Republic itself. (In fact the Vltava also carries more water than the Elbe at their confluence.)

Hierarchical list
Rivers not located themselves within the Czech Republic but possessing tributaries originating on the Czech territory are shown in strikethrough italics. Rivers over 100 km long or having average discharge greater than 10 m³/s are emphasized in bold.

Rivers flowing to the North Sea (Elbe basin)
tributaries joining the Elbe during its course through Germany (from area along Czech-German border in NW of the country, esp. from the Ore Mountains)

Elbe; leaves the Czech Republic at Hřensko, empties into the North Sea)
Havel
Spree (c. 1 km section of upper course in Fukov salient; in Lusatian Highlands)
Saale
Rokytnice (originates in the Fichtel Mountains)
White Elster (originates in the Fichtel Mountains)
Mulde
Zwickauer Mulde
Černá (originates in the Ore Mountains)
Moldavský potok (originates in Ore Mountains)
Zschopau
Polava (originates in the Ore Mountains)
Přísečnice (originates in the Ore Mountains)
Černá voda
Flöha (originates in the Ore Mountains)
Černá
Načetínský potok
Svídnice
Weißeritz
Divoká Bystřice (originates in the Ore Mountains)
Rašelinový potok
Müglitz
Mohelnice (originates in the Ore Mountains)
Černý potok
Rybný potok (originates in the Ore Mountains)
Slatina
Petrovický potok
Olšový potok
Rájecký potok
Hraniční potok
Větrovský potok
Lišči potok
Ostrovská Bělá (originates in the Elbe Sandstone Mountains)
Sněžnický potok
Liščí potok
Dubný potok
Mlžný potok
Sporný potok
Lachsbach
Vilémovský potok (a.k.a. Sebnice, ; originates in the Elbe Sandstone Mountains)
Křinice (originates in the Elbe Sandstone Mountains)

tributaries joining the Elbe within Czech Republic, i.e. rivers from major part of Bohemia

Kamenice (in Hřensko)
Ploučnice (in Děčín)
Robečský potok
Svitávka (near Zákupy)
Jílovský potok (in Děčín)
Bílina (in Ústí nad Labem)
Srpina
Modla (in Lovosice)
Ohře (in Litoměřice)
Čepel (in Doksany)
Chomutovka (below Postoloprty)
Hasina
Blšanka
Liboc (in Libočany)
Bystřice
Teplá (in Karlovy Vary)
Otročínský potok
Pramenský potok
Rolava (in Karlovy Vary)
Svatava (in Sokolov)
Libocký potok (in Kynšperk nad Ohří)
Odrava
Plesná
Liběchovka (in Liběchov)
Pšovka (in Mělník)
Vltava (in Mělník; Vltava is the name given to Teplá Vltava after its confluence with Studená Vltava)
Bakovský potok
Zákolanský potok (in Kralupy nad Vltavou)
Únětický potok (in Roztoky)
Śárecký potok  (in Prague-Dejvice)
Rokytka (in Prague-Libeň)
Brusnice (in Prague)
Motolský potok (in Prague-Smíchov)
Botič (in Prague-Vyšehrad)
Berounka (in Prague-Lahovice; Berounka is the name given to the lower Mže following its confluence with the Radbuza)
Loděnice (a.k.a. Kačák)
Litavka (in Beroun)
Klíčava
Rakovnický potok
Javornice
Střela
Třemošná
Klabava
Úslava (in Plzeň-Doubravka)
Bradava
Radbuza (in Plzeň)
Úhlava (in Plzeň-Doudlevce)
Zubřina
Mže (headwater of Berounka)
Úterský potok
Úhlavka (in Stříbro)
Kosový potok
Hamerský potok
Sázava (in Davle)
Blanice (a.k.a. Vlašimská Blanice)
Želivka
Trnava (a.k.a. Trnávka)
Sázavka
Šlapanka
Kocába
Mastník
Otava (under Zvíkov Castle; Otava originates at confluence of Vydra and Křemelná)
Lomnice
Skalice
Blanice (a.k.a. Vodňanská Blanice)
Volyňka (in Strakonice)
Spůlka
Ostružná
Křemelná
Vydra
Lužnice (in Týn nad Vltavou)
Smutná (in Bechyně)
Nežárka (in Veselí nad Lužnicí; Nežárka originates at confluence of the Kamenice and Žirovnice)
Kamenice
Žirovnice
Dračice
Malše (in České Budějovice)
Stropnice
Černá
Teplá Vltava (headwater of Vltava and the whole Elbe-Vltava system)
Studená Vltava
Výmola
Jizera
Klenice (in Mladá Boleslav)
Bělá
Zábrdka
Mohelka
Žehrovka
Libuňka (in Turnov)
Oleška (in Semily)
Kamenice
Desná
Mumlava
Vlkava
Výrovka
Šembera
Mrlina (in Nymburk)
Cidlina (in Libice nad Cidlinou)
Bystřice (in Chlumec nad Cidlinou)
Javorka
Klejnárka
Vrchlice
Doubrava
Chrudimka (in Pardubice)
Novohradka
Loučná
Orlice (in Hradec Králové; Orlice originates through confluence of Divoká Orlice and Tichá Orlice)
Dědina (in Třebechovice pod Orebem)
Tichá Orlice
 Třebovka (in Ústí nad Orlicí)
Divoká Orlice
Bělá
Kněžná
Zdobnice
Rokytenka (in Žamberk)
Metuje (in Jaroměř)
Úpa (in Jaroměř)
Ličná
Malá Úpa
Malé Labe
Bílé Labe

Rivers flowing to the Baltic Sea (Oder basin)
tributaries joining the Oder during its course through Poland (from northern parts of Bohemia (esp. around city of Liberec - Frýdlant Hills, Zittau Basin and NW slopes of the Jizera Mountains) and NW portion of Czech Silesia (esp. Jeseník District))

 

Oder (leaves the Czech Republic at Bohumín, empties into the Baltic Sea)
Lausitzer Neiße
Jeřice (in Chrastava)
Smědá
Mandau
Bóbr (originates in eastern Giant Mountains – only source with c. 2.5 km of uppermost course are located in the Czech Republic)
Nysa Kłodzka
Bělá (a.k.a. Jesenická Bělá)
Vidnavka
Stěnava
Osoblaha
Prudník

tributaries joining the Oder within Czech Republic, i.e. rivers from NE parts of the country, esp. Moravian-Silesian Region

Olza (below Bohumín)
Petrůvka
Stonávka  (below Karviná)
Ropičanka (above Český Těšín)
Tyrka (in Třinec)
Hluchová (in Bystřice)
Lomná (in Jablunkov)
Ostravice (in Ostrava)
Lučina
Morávka (in Frýdek-Místek)
Čeladenka (above Frýdlant nad Ostravicí)
Černá Ostravice
Bílá Ostravice
Opava (in Ostrava)
Moravice (below Opava)
Černý potok
Čižina
Opavice  (below Krnov)
Ondřejnice
Jičínka
Lubina

Rivers flowing to the Black Sea (Danube basin)
rivers from SE regions of the country (i.e. most of Moravia)
(The Morava accounts for almost all discharge, the only exception being the Vlára, which belongs to the Váh subbasin)

Danube (empties into the Black Sea, does not itself reach the Czech territory (flowing only through neighbouring countries of Germany, Austria and Slovakia)
Váh
Vlára
Morava
Thaya; originates at confluence of Moravian Thaya and German Thaya)
Kyjovka
Trkmanka
Svratka
Litava
Svitava (below Brno)
Punkva
Křetínka
Loučka (originates through confluence of Bobrůvka and Libochůvka)
Bobrůvka
Libochůvka
Jihlava (in fact a tributary to Svratka but nowadays their confluence is completely within Nové Mlýny Reservoir, thus creating an impression of a direct tributary to Thaya)
Rokytná
Oslava
Brtnice
Jihlávka
Jevišovka
Moravian Thaya
German Thaya
Velička
Olšava (above Kostelany nad Moravou)
Dřevnice (in Otrokovice)
Rusava
Moštěnka (above Kroměříž)
Haná (above Kroměříž)
Valová (this is the name for lower course of Romže after confluence with Hloučela)
Romže
Hloučela
Blata
Bečva (originates at confluence of Vsetínská Bečva and Rožnovská Bečva)
Vsetínská Bečva (in Valašské Meziříčí)
Senice
Rožnovská Bečva (in Valašské Meziříčí)
Bystřice (in Olomouc)
Trusovický potok (in Olomouc-Ćernovír)
Oskava
Třebůvka
Rohelnice
Mírovka (below Mohelnice)
Moravská Sázava
Březná
Desná
Merta
Branná (in Hanušovice)
Krupá

tributaries to the Danube from SW borders of the country (i.e. rivers flowing from Bohemian Forest and Upper Palatinate Forest to Upper Austria and Bavaria)
Große Mühl
Horský potok
Lhotecký potok
Mlýnský potok
Bukový potok
Rožnovský potok
Světlá
Urešův potok
Hraniční potok
Regen
Chamb
Schwarzer Regen
Großer Regen
Naab
Schwarzach
Pfreimd
Waldnaab

Alphabetical list

Bečva
Berounka
Botič
Bystřice
Bílina
Čeladenka
Chrudimka
Cidlina
Doubrava
Elbe
Flöha
Freiberger Mulde
Gottleuba
Hluchová
Jevišovka
Jihlava
Jizera
Kamenice
Klabava
Klejnárka
Liběchovka
Loděnice
Litavka
Lomná
Lusatian Neisse
Lužnice
Lučina
Malše
Mandau
Metuje
Mírovka
Morava
Moravice
Mrlina
Nežárka
Oder
Ohře
Olza
Opava
Orlice
Oslava
Ostravice
Otava
Petrůvka
Ploučnice
Pšovka
Punkva
Radbuza
Rolava
Sázava
Střela
Svatava
Svitava
Svratka
Teplá
Thaya
Úhlava
Úpa
Úslava
Vltava
Volyňka
White Elster
Želivka

Notes

 
Czech Republic
Rivers
Articles containing video clips